The Women's compound team event at the 2010 South American Games had its qualification during the individual qualification on March 21, and the finals on March 24. Since there were only 3 teams, no bronze medal was awarded.

Medalists

Results

Qualification

Draw

References
Qualification 
Draw

Team Compound Women